Franklin Lorenzo Richards West (February 1, 1885 – October 21, 1966) was an American educator and a leader in the Church of Jesus Christ of Latter-day Saints (LDS Church).

West was born and raised in Ogden, Utah Territory, to Joseph A. West and Josephine Richards. He earned a B.S. from the Utah Agricultural College in 1904 and a Ph.D from the University of Chicago in 1911. West was a professor of physics at the Utah Agricultural College, which is today Utah State University.  For 28 years he was the dean of faculty at the school.

From 1935 to 1937, West was the second assistant to Albert E. Bowen, the head of the LDS Church's Young Men's Mutual Improvement Association. In 1936, he became the eighth Commissioner of Church Education, a position he held until he retired in 1953.

West was the author of five books, including three manuals for the Church Educational System and a biography of his maternal grandfather, LDS Church apostle Franklin D. Richards. West was also the grandson of Chauncey W. West, a Mormon pioneer and prominent leader of the LDS Church in Weber County, Utah for which he also wrote a biography.

West was married to Gladys Spencer, August 19, 1904 a granddaughter of Brigham Young and a member of the prominent Thatcher Young family of Logan, Utah.  Children: Gladys Virginia and Marjorie. They later divorced and West married Violet Madsen, February 12, 1920 of Ogden, Utah.  After Violet Madsen's death, he married Mrs. Sarah Frances Nelson Malmborg who survived him.

Notes

External links

Franklin L. West Oral Histories, MSS 8353; 20th Century Western and Mormon Manuscripts; L. Tom Perry Special Collections, Harold B. Lee Library, Brigham Young University.

1885 births
1966 deaths
American Latter Day Saint writers
20th-century American physicists
Commissioners of Church Education (LDS Church)
Counselors in the General Presidency of the Young Men (organization)
Scientists from Ogden, Utah
Richards–Young family
Utah State University faculty
American leaders of the Church of Jesus Christ of Latter-day Saints
Latter Day Saints from Illinois
Latter Day Saints from Utah